The Roman Catholic Diocese of Jowai is a diocese located in the town of Jowai in the Ecclesiastical province of Shillong in India. In a land area of 3,819 square kilometers, the diocesan territory covers the districts of East and West Jaintia Hills in Meghalaya.

History
The Diocese of Jowai was erected on January 28, 2006 by Pope Benedict XVI, and Father Vincent Kympat was appointed its first bishop. He was ordained on April 2, 2006 by the Apostolic Nuncio to India, Archbishop Pedro Lopez Quintana.

Statistics
When the new diocese of Jowai was erected in the year 2006, it had 59,095 baptized Catholics in the territory which covers Jaintia hills district under 7 parishes. The diocese have steadily been growing through the years and in 2019 the population of Catholics in the territory have grown to 106,027 under 17 parishes.

Leadership
 Bishops of Jowai (Latin Rite)
 Bishop Vincent Kympat (January 28, 2006 – July 30, 2011)
Bishop Vincent Kympat was born December 17, 1946 in Moosutong in Shillong Diocese. He was ordained a priest on January 23, 1977 in the diocese of Shillong. He was appointed Bishop of Jowai on January 28, 2006 and was ordained on April 2, 2006. Before becoming a prelate Bishop Kympat was the chairman of Faith Formation Commission and Diocesan Coordinator for Small Christian Communities in the Archdiocese of Shillong.

He was the Chairman of Small Christian Communities Commission in North Eastern Regional Bishops' Council of India before he died on July 30, 2011.

References

External links
 GCatholic.org 
 Catholic Hierarchy 

Roman Catholic dioceses in India
Christianity in Meghalaya
Christian organizations established in 2006
Roman Catholic dioceses and prelatures established in the 21st century
2006 establishments in Meghalaya